Utraquism (from the Latin sub utraque specie, meaning "under both kinds") or Calixtinism (from chalice; Latin: calix, mug, borrowed from Greek kalyx, shell, husk; Czech: kališníci) was a belief amongst Hussites, a reformist Christian movement, that communion under both kinds (both bread and wine, as opposed to the bread alone) should be administered to the laity during the celebration of the Eucharist. It was a principal dogma of the Hussites and one of the Four Articles of Prague. After the Hussite movement split into various factions early in the Hussite Wars, Hussites that emphasized the laity's right to communion under both kinds became known as Moderate Hussites, Utraquist Hussites, or simply Utraquists. The Utraquists were the largest major Hussite faction.

Following the victory of allied Utraquist and Catholic forces in the Hussite Wars, Utraquists constituted a majority of the Bohemian population until the outbreak of the Thirty Years' War, nearly two centuries later. The Battle of White Mountain, in 1620, marked the end of the Bohemian Revolt and, consequently, the end of almost two hundred years of Utraquist predominance.

History 

Utraquism was a Christian dogma first proposed by Jacob of Mies, professor of philosophy at the University of Prague, in 1414. It maintained that the Eucharist should be administered "under both kinds" – as both bread and wine – to all the congregation, including the laity. The practice among Roman Catholics at the time was for only the priests to partake of the consecrated wine, the Precious Blood.

The Utraquists were a moderate faction of the Hussites (in contrast to the more radical Taborites, Orebites and Orphans). They were also known as the Prague Party or the Calixtines – from calix, Latin for their emblem, the chalice.

The Utraquists eventually allied themselves with the Catholic forces and defeated the more radical Taborites and Orphans at the Battle of Lipany in 1434. After that battle, nearly all forms of Hussite revival were Utraquist, as seen with George of Poděbrady, who even managed to cause the town of Tábor, the famous Taborite stronghold, to convert to Utraquism.

See also
Religious peace of Kutná Hora
Altar Wings of Roudníky
Concomitance (doctrine)

References

Bibliography 

 
 
 

Hussite Wars